Come Back Miss Pipps is a 1941 Our Gang short comedy film directed by Edward Cahn. It was the 198th Our Gang short (199th episode, 110th talking short, 111th talking episode, and 30th MGM produced episode) that was released. The tile evokes MGM's British schoolteacher film Goodbye, Mr. Chips (1939) and was Clarence Wilson's final film appearance.

Plot
Upon learning that Mr. Pratt, the mean old school board chairman, has fired their beloved teacher Miss Pipps because she threw a birthday party for one of her students during class, the gang decides to invite their parents to a special performance of a play exposing Pratt's injustices in running the school. As a result, he's demoted to caretaker, while Mr. Swenson is justifiably promoted to Pratt's former position...and Miss Pipps returns. Yet, compassion is shown to Mr. Pratt when his birthday is honored.

Cast

The Gang
 Mickey Gubitosi as Mickey
 Darla Hood as Darla
 George McFarland as Spanky
 Billy Laughlin as Froggy
 Billie Thomas as Buckwheat

Additional cast
 Sara Haden as Miss Pipps
 Clarence Wilson as Alonzo K. Pratt
 Christian Rub as Mr. Swenson
 Barbara Bedford as Parent
 Billy Bletcher as Froggy's father
 Byron Foulger as Attourney Arthur Prince
 Leon Tyler as Kid playing "Mr. Smith"
 James Gubitosi as Extra
 Giovanna Gubitosi as Girl in audience
 Tommy McFarland as Extra
 Venita Vencent as Extra

See also
 Our Gang filmography

References

External links
 

1941 films
American black-and-white films
Films directed by Edward L. Cahn
Metro-Goldwyn-Mayer short films
1941 comedy films
Our Gang films
1941 short films
Films about teacher–student relationships
1940s American films